Antoine Auguste Adrien Henri Tanoux (18 October 1865, Marseille – 29 July 1923, Paris) was a French painter.

Biography 
After graduating there, in 1886, he enrolled at the École nationale supérieure des beaux-arts in Paris, where he became a student of Léon Bonnat.

During this time, he presented some works at the Salon. He would exhibit there regularly throughout his life. In 1889, he received an honorable mention at the Exposition Universelle.

He was initially attracted to painting scenes in the outlying suburbs but, after receiving a travel grant from the Conseil supérieur des Beaux-Arts in 1895, he turned to genre scenes, portraits and Orientalist works; becoming especially well known for his nudes. In 1905, he was elected a member of the Société des artistes français.

A retrospective of his work was held in 1924.

His works may be seen at the Musée des Beaux-Arts de Chambéry, Musée de Grenoble, Musée des Beaux-Arts de Marseille, Musée Cantini, Musée de la Faïence et des Beaux-Arts, Musée des Beaux-Arts de Nice and the Musée des Beaux-Arts de Rouen, among others.

References

External links 

 More works by Tanoux @ ArtNet
 Works by Tanoux @ the Base Joconde

1865 births
1923 deaths
19th-century French painters
French orientalists
French genre painters
Artists from Marseille
20th-century French painters